

Atlántida

Bay Islands

Colón

Comayagua

Copán

Cortés

Choluteca

El Paraíso

Francisco Morazán

Gracias a Dios

Intibucá

La Paz

Lempira

Ocotepeque

Olancho

Santa Bárbara

Innovation and Unity Party did not presented candidates

Valle

Political Broad Front in Resistance did not presented candidates.

Yoro

See also

References

Elections in Honduras
2013 elections in Central America
2013 in Honduras